Julius Lipner (born 11 August 1946), who is of Indo-Czech origin, is Professor of Hinduism and the Comparative Study of Religion at the University of Cambridge.

Early life
Lipner was born and brought up in India, for the most part in West Bengal. After his schooling in India, he obtained a Licentiate in Theology (summa cum laude) in the Pontifical Athenaeum (now Jnana Deepa Vidyapith) in Poona, and then spent two years studying for an M.A. in Indian and Western philosophy at Jadavpur University in Calcutta (Kolkata).

Before taking his final examinations, he was invited by the philosopher H.D. Lewis to undertake doctoral research (under Lewis’ supervision) in the Self with reference to Indian and Western thought, at King's College, University of London.

Career
Lipner obtained his PhD in 1974, and then spent a little over a year as lecturer in Indian religion at the University of Birmingham, before being appointed to Cambridge University in 1975, where he has taught ever since. 
 
Lipner has numerous publications in his fields of specialism to his credit; these include 12 volumes (authored, co-authored and edited) and more than 80 articles and translations.

He lectures widely in the UK and abroad, and was appointed visiting scholar and visiting professor in a number of universities both nationally and internationally. He made a number of radio and TV appearances, and is a member of the editorial board of several international journals. His special fields of study are Vedantic thought, 19th-century Bengal, and inter-cultural and inter-religious understanding, with special reference to the Hindu and Christian traditions. One of his research projects is the theory and practice of Hindu image-worship.

Lipner is a Fellow and former vice-president of Clare Hall] - a postgraduate College of the University of Cambridge - and in 2008 he became a Fellow of the British Academy.

Personal life
Lipner married his Bengali wife Anindita in 1971; they have two children and six grandchildren.

Publications
Among his published books are the following—
 The Face of Truth: a Study of Meaning and Metaphysics in the Vedantic Theology of Ramanuja, 1976; sole author;
 Hindu Ethics: Purity, Abortion and Euthanasia, 1989; co-author;
 Brahmabandhab Upadhyay: The Life and Thought of a Revolutionary, 1999; sole author – this book was given the award for the “Best Book in Hindu-Christian Studies 1997-1999” by The Society for Hindu-Christian Studies (affiliated to the American Academy of Religion);
 Anandamath, or The Sacred Brotherhood (sole translator/author; this book contains a full English translation of Bankim Chatterji’s famous 19th-century Bengali novel, with an extensive Introduction and Critical Apparatus, and received the A.K. Ramanujan Book Prize for Translation awarded by The South Asia Council of the Association for Asian Studies in the USA;
 two editions of Hindus: their religious beliefs and practices, 1994 and 2010 (sole author), the second edition being a thoroughly revised and substantially enlarged version of the first)

References

1946 births
Living people
Alumni of King's College London
Fellows of Clare Hall, Cambridge
Academics of the University of Cambridge
Indian religion academics
Academics of the University of Birmingham
Hindu studies scholars
Fellows of the British Academy
Alumni of the University of Birmingham
Jadavpur University alumni